Harry Churcher (21 November 1910 – 24 June 1972) was a British racewalker. He competed in the 10 km walk at the 1948 Summer Olympics.

References

1910 births
1972 deaths
British male racewalkers
Olympic athletes of Great Britain
Athletes (track and field) at the 1948 Summer Olympics